This is a list of team records for the Baltimore Orioles baseball franchise. Records include when the franchise was the Brewers and Browns.

Single Game Record
Most Hits In A Game: 6 Cal Ripken Jr. (6/13/1999)

All-time team season records

Batting
Batting Average: George Sisler, .420
On-base percentage: George Sisler, .467
Slugging Percentage: Goose Goslin, .652
OPS: George Sisler, 1.081
At Bats: B. J. Surhoff, 673
Runs: Harlond Clift, 145
Hits: George Sisler, 257
Total Bases: George Sisler, 399
Doubles: Brian Roberts, 56
Home Runs: Chris Davis, 53
Triples: 12, Paul Blair
RBI: Ken Williams, 155
Walks: Lu Blue, 126
Strikeouts: Chris Davis, 219
Stolen Bases: Luis Aparicio, 57
Singles: Jack Tobin, 179
Runs Created: George Sisler, 179
Extra-Base Hits: Chris Davis, 96
Times on Base: George Sisler, 305
Hit By Pitch: Brady Anderson, 24
Sacrifice Hits: Joe Gedeon, 48
Sacrifice Flies: Bobby Bonilla, 17
Intentional Walks: Eddie Murray, 25
Grounded into Double Plays: Cal Ripken, 32
At Bats per Strikeout: Clint Courtney, 56.7
At Bats per Home Run: Jim Gentile, 10.6
Outs: Brooks Robinson, 517
Most Games: 163, Brooks Robinson (1961, 1964) and Cal Ripken

Pitching

ERA: Barney Pelty, 1.59
Wins: Urban Shocker, 27
WHIP: Dave McNally, .842
Hits Allowed/9IP:  Dave McNally, 5.77
Walks/9IP: Scott McGregor, 1.19
Strikeouts/9IP: Mike Mussina, 8.73
Saves: Jim Johnson, 51
Innings: Urban Shocker, 348
Strikeouts: Rube Waddell, 232
Complete Games: Jack Powell, 36
Shutouts: Jim Palmer, 10
Walks Allowed: Bobo Newsom, 192
Hits Allowed: Urban Shocker, 365
Strikeout to Walk: Mike Mussina, 4.57
Losses: Fred Glade, 25
Earned Runs Allowed: Bobo Newsom, 186
Wild Pitches: Daniel Cabrera, 17
Hit Batsmen: Barney Pelty, 20
Batters Faced: Bobo Newsom, 1,475
Games Finished: Gregg Olson, 62

All-time team career leaders

Batting
Batting Average: George Sisler, .344
On-base percentage: Ken Williams, .403
Slugging Percentage: Ken Williams, .558
OPS: Ken Williams, .961
Games: Cal Ripken, 3,001
At Bats: Cal Ripken, 11,551
Runs: Cal Ripken, 1,647
Hits: Cal Ripken, 3,184
Total Bases: Cal Ripken, 5,168
Doubles: Cal Ripken, 603
Triples: George Sisler, 145
Home Runs: Cal Ripken, 431 
RBI: Cal Ripken, 1,695
Walks: Cal Ripken, 1,129
Strikeouts: Chris Davis, Cal Ripken, 1,305
Stolen Bases: George Sisler, 351
Singles: Cal Ripken, 2,106
Runs Created: Cal Ripken, 1,772
Extra-Base Hits: Cal Ripken, 1,078
Times on Base: Cal Ripken, 4,379
Hit By Pitch: Brady Anderson, 148
Sacrifice Hits: Jimmy Austin, 223
Sacrifice Flies: Cal Ripken, 127
Intentional Walks: Eddie Murray, 135
Grounded into Double Plays: Cal Ripken, 350
At Bats per Strikeout: Hank Severeid, 27.8
At Bats per Home Run: Jim Gentile, 15.4
Outs: Cal Ripken, 8,893

Pitching
ERA: Harry Howell, 2.06
Wins: Jim Palmer, 268
Won-Loss %: Chris Davis, 1.00
WHIP: Dick Hall, 1.005
Hits Allowed/9IP: Stu Miller, 6.90
Walks/9IP: Dick Hall, 1.47
Strikeouts/9IP: Arthur Rhodes, 8.37
Games: Jim Palmer, 558
Saves: Gregg Olson, 160
Innings: Jim Palmer, 3,948 
Strikeouts: Jim Palmer, 2,212
Games Started: Jim Palmer, 521
Complete Games: Jim Palmer, 211
Shutouts: Jim Palmer, 53
Home Runs Allowed: Jim Palmer, 303
Walks Allowed: Jim Palmer, 1,311
Hits Allowed: Jim Palmer, 3,349
Strikeout to Walk: Dick Hall, 3.96
Losses: Jim Palmer, 152
Earned Runs Allowed: Jim Palmer, 1,253
Wild Pitches: Jim Palmer, 85
Hit Batsmen: Barney Pelty, 103
Batters Faced: Jim Palmer, 16,112
Games Finished: Tippy Martinez, 298

Records
Baltimore Orioles